Christopher Goutman (born December 19, 1952) is an American writer, producer, actor and director. He is most notable for his work on daytime soap operas.

He was married from 1985–2016 to actress Marcia McCabe, whom he met while he was on Search for Tomorrow.

Positions held
All My Children
Director: 1987 – 1996, 2013

Another World
Executive Producer: November 1998 – June 25, 1999
Director: 1983 – 1987, 1998–1999

As the World Turns
Head Writer (with Vivian Gundaker): January 25, 2008 – April 18, 2008
Executive Producer: July 1999 – Sept 17, 2010
Occasional Director: 1999–2010
Director: 1996 – 1998

Days of Our Lives
Director: June 1, 2011 – July 15, 2011 (three episodes)

Guiding Light
Director: 1982 – 1983

Santa Barbara
Director (late 1980s)

The Young and the Restless
Director: December 15, 2010 – January 2011 (two episodes)

Acting credits
1978–79: Search for Tomorrow as Marc D'Antoni 
1980-1981: The Edge of Night as Sharkey
1981: Charlie's Angels as David (episode: "Waikiki Angels")
1981: Bosom Buddies as Todd (episode: "Beauty and the Beasts")
1981: The Prowler as Deputy Mark London
1982: Texas as George St. John
1983: The Powers of Matthew Star as Lou Daggot (episode: "The Great Waldo Shepherd")
1985: Goodbye, New York as Jack
1986: George Washington II: The Forging of a Nation as James Reynolds

Awards and nominations
Daytime Emmy Awards
Nominations: (2002, 2004–2006; Best Drama Series; ATWT); (1990–1994; Best Directing; AMC)
Wins: (2001, 2003; Best Drama Series; ATWT); (1995; Best Directing; AMC)

His first awards nomination in 1990 was shared with Jack Coffey, Henry Kaplan, Conal O'Brien, Barbara M. Simmons, and Shirley Simmons.

Directors Guild of America
Nominations: 1998 (for ATWT, shared with Charles C. Dyer and Maria Wagner – episode #10,446), 2005, 2008

References

External links
 

American soap opera writers
Living people
Soap opera producers
American television directors
Directors Guild of America Award winners
Daytime Emmy Award winners
1952 births